George Ackerman may refer to:
 George W. Ackerman (1884–1962), American government photographer
 George Ackerman (American football) (1905–1971), American football and baseball coach